Club Necaxa Femenil is a Mexican women's football club based in Aguascalientes, Aguascalientes, Mexico. The club has been the female section of Club Necaxa since 2017. The team will play in the Liga MX Femenil which is scheduled to commence in September 2017.

Personnel

Coaching staff

Players

Current squad
As of 16 July 2021

References

Liga MX Femenil teams
 
Association football clubs established in 2017
Football clubs in Aguascalientes
Women's association football clubs in Mexico
2017 establishments in Mexico